The Ngondi–Ngiri languages are a clade of Bantu languages. The Ngondi languages are coded Zone C.10 (Ngondi) in Guthrie's classification. According to Nurse & Philippson (2003), they form a valid node with the Ngiri language(s) of C.30:
 Ngondi (C.10):  Aka (Yaka, Benzele) – Ngando (incl. Kota), Bole (Dibole), Ngondi, Pande (incl. Gongo), Mbati, Bomitaba–Enyele–Bondongo–Mbonzo, Bongili, Bala (Lobala), Bomboli–Bozaba; (C.30) Ngiri (Loi, Likila)–Mabale–Ndobo–Litoka–Balobo–Enga

Footnotes

References